Peuvillers is a commune in the Meuse department in Grand Est in north-eastern France.

History 

Peuvillers was a part of French Luxembourg from 1659 until 1790, in the bailiwick of Marville. The hospital of 14th Foot Artillery Regiment was located in Peuvillers where the German NCO Heinrich Wilhelm Koch died at the age of 20. He was buried in January 1917 at the Ladhof Cemetery in Colmar, Alsace, where his family lived.

Gallery

See also
Communes of the Meuse department

References 

Communes of Meuse (department)